Central Embassy is the crown jewel in an illustrious series of high-profile projects by Thailand's largest retail chain, Central Group's new flagship property is Central Embassy. This unique architectural monument, with its daring curves and vibrant exterior, has revitalized both the skyline and the spirit of Bangkok. It was constructed on the site of the former British Embassy gardens and is located at the busy junction of Wireless and Ploen Chit. with an ultra-modern building that honors tradition.

A love of expressive clothing, delicious food, burgeoning art, enthralling music, joy, and comfort are just a few of the characteristics that make the city so unmistakably Thai, and Central Embassy perfectly portrays them. The six-story retail podium is home to the largest names in fashion, beauty, design, cuisine, and technology. Its lofty voids have also played host to works, collections, and performances by well-known musicians, fashion designers, curators, and visual artists. With views of the sights and lights of Bangkok's downtown from its lush sky terraces and top-floor restaurants, it provides one of the most beautiful sunsets in the city every day.

History 
This Bangkok development project is for a mixed-use commercial area. A premier commercial hub is what it comprises. The Department of Business Administration Group, Central Group Company Limited, and Central Department of Trade Company Limited are in charge of department stores, hotels, and office complexes that are situated in the former site of the UK Embassy in Thailand, which is on the northwest corner of the Ploenchit intersection. AUCTION WINNER: The Central Group A portion of the Ploenchit City project is the project at hand. This sparked the Central Bangkok Project Of Central Bangkok Project by Uninger Company Limited, the owner of the Park Venture Building, which included the Okuma Prestige Hotel Bangkok.

According to the plan, Central Embassy had planned to formally open the shopping center at the end of 2013, but due to construction delays, the opening was postponed for February 2014 after the group of PDRC began settling in a neighborhood in Bangkok's inner city. This caused the construction of the project to be disrupted from that point on, and it also caused the Central Embassy to delay the opening of the shopping center once more. The Central Group originally planned to launch the shopping mall in March 2014, however, a questionable circumstance forced them to delay it a further four times, to May 2014. After the situation had calmed down, Central Group revealed the Central Embassy's launch date.

As of right now, all services are available at the retail complex and the Park Hyatt Bangkok Hotel. On May 18, 2017, with the theme "This Brings Me Here," the Central Group formally debuted the shopping complexes and hotels.

Location
Central Embassy is in 1031 Ploenchit Road, Mubarakwan, Pathumwan District, Bangkok 10330

Transportation
• Chalermprakiet 6 Life Cycle Penalty : Chit Lom BTS Station ( connects to Central Department Store, Chidlom on the 2nd floor ) and Phloen Chit BTS Station ( directly connects to the Embassi Park Building on the 1st floor. )

• Bus of the Bangkok Mass Transit Organization : Lines 2, 25, 40, 48, 501, 508, 511, 513 through the Ploenchit Road.

Layout
The mall was designed by Amanda Levete Architects. The building is shaped like an infinity symbol when viewed from the top.

References

Shopping malls in Bangkok
Pathum Wan district
Shopping malls established in 2014
2014 establishments in Thailand